Ekaterine Gorgodze and Ankita Raina were the defending champions but Gorgodze chose not to participate. Raina partnered alongside Tereza Mihalíková but lost in the quarterfinals to Angelina Gabueva and Anastasia Zakharova.

Anna Danilina and Viktória Kužmová won the title, defeating Gabueva and Zakharova in the final, 4–6, 6–3, [10–2].

Seeds

Draw

Draw

References
Main Draw

Al Habtoor Tennis Challenge - Doubles
2021 Doubles